Mercey-sur-Saône (literally Mercey on Saône) is a commune in the Haute-Saône department in the region of Bourgogne-Franche-Comté in eastern France.

See also
Communes of the Haute-Saône department

References

Communes of Haute-Saône